The Flying Opera is a boxed set containing two DVDs and two CDs by the German power metal band Avantasia, released in March 2011. Avantasia evolved from being a side-project of Edguy vocalist Tobias Sammet to a full-fledged band touring all over the world. The tracks of the set were recorded live during their first world tour in 2008, in support of the album The Scarecrow. The DVD contains also a documentary of the tour and various video clips.

A three-LPs Limited Edition live album of The Flying Opera was released by Nuclear Blast Records in October 2011, with a total of 10.000 copies being printed

Track listing

DVD
Disc 1
Live at Wacken Open Air 2008 (songs 1-4, 8, 11-13, 15) and Masters of Rock Festival 2008 (songs 5-7, 9-10, 14, 16).
 "Twisted Mind"
 "The Scarecrow"
 "Another Angel Down"
 "Prelude/Reach Out for the Light"
 "Inside"
 "No Return"
 "The Story Ain‘t Over"
 "Shelter from the Rain"
 "Lost In Space"
 "I Don‘t Believe in Your Love"
 "Avantasia"
 "Serpents in Paradise"
 "Promised Land"
 "The Toy Master"
 "Farewell"
 "Sign of the Cross/The Seven Angels (Medley)"

Disc 2
 Around the World in 20 Days – The Movie (documentary)
 "Lost in Space" (video clip)
 "Carry Me Over" (video clip)
 "Carry Me Over" (Making of the video clip)
 "Dying for an Angel" (video clip)

CD

Personnel
 Tobias Sammet - lead vocals
 Sascha Paeth - guitars
 Oliver Hartmann - guitars, backing vocals (lead vocals on tracks 10 and 16)
 Robert Hunecke-Rizzo - bass, backing vocals
 Miro - keyboards, backing vocals
 Felix Bohnke - drums
 Amanda Somerville - backing vocals (lead vocals on tracks 15 and 16)
 Cloudy Yang - backing vocals

Tour guests

 Jørn Lande - lead vocals on tracks 2, 3, 12, 13 and 16
 Andre Matos - lead vocals on tracks 4, 5, 6, 8 and 16
 Bob Catley - lead vocals on tracks 7, 8 and 16
 Kai Hansen - lead vocals on track 14 and 16
 Henjo Richter - guitar on track 14

References

Avantasia albums
2011 live albums
Nuclear Blast video albums
Nuclear Blast live albums
2011 video albums
Live video albums